Jon Kolb (born August 30, 1947) is an American former professional football player who was an offensive tackle and center for 13 seasons with the Pittsburgh Steelers of the National Football League (NFL). He was also an occasional strongman competitor in some of the early World's Strongest Man contests.

Early years
Born in Ponca City, Oklahoma, Kolb attended Owasso High School, where he earned all-state honors during his senior year. He attended Oklahoma State University–Stillwater where he started at center.  While at OSU he was named All-Big Eight in 1967 and 1968 and was selected All-American in 1968.

Professional career
Kolb was drafted by Pittsburgh out of OSU in 1969, and played with the Steelers from 1969 to 1981. Kolb did not start in any game during his first two years, but became the starting left offensive tackle in 1971, replacing Mike Haggerty, for all 14 games, remaining in that position until 1981, his final year, though in the final two years he shared time with Ted Petersen (1980) and Ray Pinney (1981). He played next to left guard Sam Davis from 1971 to 1979, Davis' final year. Overall, Kolb started at offensive tackle in 177 games and earned 4 Super Bowl rings, during the 1974, 1975, 1978, and 1979 seasons.

During his playing days, Kolb was widely regarded as one of the strongest men in the NFL and played like the strongest one, protecting Terry Bradshaw's blind side from his left offensive tackle position on pass plays and opening holes for running backs Franco Harris, Rocky Bleier, and John Fuqua.  Like many of the Steeler players of the 1970s, Kolb had his own cadre of fans, known as "Kolb's Kowboys."

Strongman competitions
Kolb competed in the second and third annual World's Strongest Man competitions in 1978 and 1979, placing on a very good 4th rank in both years, while often defeating much heavier and stronger competitors in certain events.

Life after competition
After his playing career ended, he became a strength and conditioning coach with the Steelers.

Personal life

Kolb currently resides in Hermitage, Pennsylvania with his wife Deborah.  They have three sons.  Jon served as the defensive coordinator for Grove City College for six seasons.  He currently is teaching part-time in the Human Performance and Exercise Science department at Youngstown State University in Youngstown, Ohio as well as at BC3 in New Castle, Pennsylvania.

References

1947 births
Living people
People from Ponca City, Oklahoma
Players of American football from Oklahoma
American football offensive linemen
Oklahoma State Cowboys football players
Pittsburgh Steelers players
People from Hermitage, Pennsylvania